The 2011 Cronulla-Sutherland Sharks season is the 45th in the club's history. They are competing in the NRL's 2011 Telstra Premiership.

Ladder

Results
Round 1 – Raiders vs Sharks (Loss 40 – 12)
 Tries – Luke Douglas, Nathan Gardner

Round 2 – Sharks vs Dragons (Win 16 – 10)
 Tries – Ben Pomeroy(2), Anthony Tupou

Round 3 – Panthers vs Sharks (Win 12 – 44)
 Tries – Albert Kelly(2), Paul Gallen, Nathan Gardner, Jeremy Smith, Jon Mannah, Colin Best

Round 4 – Sharks vs Warriors (Loss 18 – 26)
 Tries – Jeremy Smith, Wade Graham, John Williams

Round 5 – Sharks vs Sea Eagles (Loss 13 – 19)
 Tries – Matthew Wright, Stuart Flanagan

Round 6 – Knights vs Sharks (Loss 24 – 20)
 Tries – Nathan Gardner(2), John Williams, Ben Pomeroy
 
Round 7 – Sharks vs Cowboys (Loss 12 – 30)
 Tries – Luke Douglas, Paul Gallen

Round 8 – Rabbitohs vs Sharks (Loss 31 – 12) 
 Tries – Paul Aiton, Wade Graham

Round 9 – BYE

Round 10 – Sharks vs Roosters (Win 18 – 4)
 Tries – Ben Pomeroy(2), Paul Gallen, Stewart Mills

Round 11 – Eels vs Sharks (Loss 40 – 6)
 Tries – Taulima Tautai

Round 12 – Storm vs Sharks (Loss 14 – 8)
 Tries – Isaac Gordon

Round 13 – Sharks vs Broncos (Loss 16 – 34)
 Tries – Jayson Bukuya, Jon Mannah, Colin Best

Round 14 – BYE
Round 15 – Bulldogs vs Sharks (Win 10 – 26)
 Tries – Nathan Gardner, Ben Pomeroy, Paul Gallen, Wade Graham

Round 16 – Titans vs Sharks (Win 12 – 36)
 Tries – Nathan Gardner(2), Paul Gallen(2), Nathan Stapleton(2)

Round 17 – Sharks vs Rabbitohs (Win 26 – 4)
 Tries – Matthew Wright(2), Luke Douglas, Colin Best, Chad Townsend

Round 18 – Sharks vs Raiders (Win 26 – 12)
 Tries – Jayson Bukuya, Wade Graham, Colin Best, Taulima Tautai, Ben Pomeroy

Round 19 – Dragons vs Sharks (Loss 38 - 8)
 Tries - Colin Best, Josh Cordoba

Round 20 – Sharks vs Knights (Loss 0 - 18)
 Tries - (Scoreless)

Round 21 – Broncos vs Sharks (Loss 46 - 16)
 Tries - Chad Townsend, Matthew Wright, Jeremy Smith

Round 22 – Sharks vs Titans (Loss 16 - 20)
 Tries - John Morris, Ben Pomeroy, Ricky Leutele

Round 23 – Sharks vs Bulldogs (Loss 12 - 19)
 Tries - Nathan Gardner, Sam Tagataese

Round 24 – Roosters vs Sharks (Loss 36 - 25)
 Tries - John Williams (2), Wade Graham, Ben Pomeroy

Round 25 – Cowboys vs Sharks (Loss 28 - 20)
 Tries - Wade Graham, Isaac Gordon, Paul Aiton

Round 26 – Sharks vs Tigers (Loss 22 - 30)
 Tries - John Williams (2), Jeremy Smith, Stewart Mills

Team Stats
Most Points – John Williams (76)
Most Tries – Ben Pomeroy (9)
Most Conversions – John Williams (26)
Most Penalty Goals – Chad Townsend, John Williams (4)
Most Field Goals – Wade Graham (2)
Most Try Assists – Paul Gallen (7)
Most Line Breaks – Nathan Gardner, Wade Graham (10)
Most All Runs – Paul Gallen (414)
Most Offloads – Anthony Tupou (57)
Most Kicks in Play – Wade Graham (154)

References

Cronulla-Sutherland Sharks seasons
Cronulla-Sutherland Sharks season